Jiangling Road is a station on Line 1 and Line 6 of the Hangzhou Metro in China. It was opened in November 2012, together with the rest of the stations on Line 1. The Line 6 part of the station was opened in December 2020. It is located in the Binjiang District of Hangzhou.

References

Railway stations in Zhejiang
Railway stations in China opened in 2012
Hangzhou Metro stations